Wilhelmina Alexander (1756–1843) is the subject of the Robert Burns song "The Bonnie Lass o'Ballochmyle".

Wilhelmina Alexander may also refer to:
Wilhelmina Alexander (artist) (1871–1961), a Canadian oil painter